Popular Democratic Party may refer to:

Popular Democratic Party (Dominican Republic)
Popular Democratic Party (France)
Popular Democratic Party (Lebanon)
Popular Democratic Party of Moldova
Popular Democratic Party (Puerto Rico)
Popular Democratic Party (Ukraine)